This is an overview of the progression of the World track cycling record of the women's 500 m time trial as recognised by the Union Cycliste Internationale.

Progression

 Record yet to be homologated

References

Track cycling world record progressions